8-hydroperoxide isomerase may refer to:
 9,12-octadecadienoate 8-hydroperoxide 8R-isomerase, an enzyme
 9,12-octadecadienoate 8-hydroperoxide 8S-isomerase, an enzyme